Rafael Novoa (born October 31, 1971, Bogotá, Colombia), is a Colombian actor.

Filmography

Television roles

References

External links 

1971 births
Colombian male film actors
Colombian male telenovela actors
Colombian male models
20th-century Colombian male actors
21st-century Colombian male actors
Living people
Male actors from Bogotá